"Lo Que Yo Sé de Ti"  is a song written and recorded by the American musical duo Ha*Ash. It was released on November 24, 2008 as the second of the single from their third studio album Habitación Doble (2008). It was written by Ashley Grace, Hanna Nicole and Leonel García.

Background and release 
"Lo Que Yo Sé de Ti" it was written by Ashley Grace, Hanna Nicole and Leonel García while its production was done by Áureo Baqueiro. Is a song recorded by American duo Ha*Ash from her third studio album Habitación Doble (2008). It was released as the second single from the album on November 24, 2008, by Sony Music Entertainment.

Music video 
A music video for "Lo Que Yo Sé de Ti" was released in November, 2008. A music video for "Lo Que Yo Sé de Ti" was published on her YouTube channel on October 25, 2009. It was directed by Pablo Davila. , the video has over 29 million views on YouTube.

The second music video for "Lo Que Yo Sé de Ti" with Leonel García recorded live for his album A Tiempo (DVD) was released on August 1, 2011.

Commercial performance 
The track peaked at number 1 in the Mexico Airplay, Mexico Espanol Airplay and Monitor Latino charts in the Mexico.

Credits and personnel 
Credits adapted from AllMusic.

Recording and management

 Recording Country: United States
 Sony / ATV Discos Music Publishing LLC / Westwood Publishing
 (P) 2008 Sony Music Entertainment México, S.A. De C.V.

Ha*Ash
 Ashley Grace  – songwriting, vocals, guitar
 Hanna Nicole  – songwriting, vocals, guitar
Additional personnel
 Leonel García  – songwriting
 Áureo Baqueiro  – producer, engingeer
 Ricardo Calderón  – photography
 Paul Forat  – A&R
 Bob Britt  – guitar
 Aaron Sterling  – drums

Charts

Release history

References 

Ha*Ash songs
2008 singles
2008 songs
Songs written by Ashley Grace
Songs written by Hanna Nicole
Songs written by Leonel García
Song recordings produced by Áureo Baqueiro
Spanish-language songs
Pop ballads
Sony Music Latin singles
2010s ballads
Monitor Latino Top General number-one singles